Valentina Stepanovna Grizodubova (Valentyna Stepanivna Hryzodubova;  in Kharkov – 28 April 1993 in Moscow) was one of the first female pilots in the Soviet Union awarded the title Hero of the Soviet Union and the only female Hero of the Soviet Union to also be awarded the title Hero of Socialist Labour.

Early life and pre-war career
Born in Kharkiv, in the Kharkov Governorate of the Russian Empire (present-day Ukraine), she was the daughter of Stepan Vasilyevich Grizodubov, a pioneer aircraft-designer. At the age of fourteen, she flew a glider solo. She played piano and graduated from a conservatory as well as from the Kharkov Technical Institute. She spoke several foreign languages. In 1929, she graduated from the Penza Flying Club of the paramilitary association OSOAVIAKhIM. She also trained at the Kharkov Flight School.

In 1933, she graduated from the Tula Advanced Flying School. Here she became a flight instructor and trained 86 male pilots, many of whom became Heroes of Soviet Union. From 1934 to 1938, she flew in a "Propaganda" Squadron named after Maxim Gorky.

She flew many types of aircraft and set seven world records including one for highest altitude reached by a female pilot on a two-seater seaplane, 3,267 meters (10718.5 feet) on 15 October 1937, (FAI Record File Number 121.16) three speed records and one for long-distance flying between Moscow and Aktyubinsk together with Marina Raskova.

On September 24–25, 1938, flying as pilot-in-command with Marina Raskova as navigator and Polina Osipenko as co-pilot, she completed the 5,910-kilometer-long flight named Rodina (Russian for "Motherland") on an Antonov ANT-37, setting an international women's record for a straight-line distance flight (FAI Record File Number 10444). She had already accumulated 5000 flight hours flight before the historic event; after the flight she and her crew members became the first women awarded the title Hero of the Soviet Union on 2 November 1938, also receiving a reward of 25,000 rubles.

World War II
Starting in March 1942, she served in the Red Army. In May, she was appointed the first commanding officer of the 101st Long-Range Aviation Regiment, which consisted of about 300 men: pilots, navigators, engineers and ground support personnel. Her unit was equipped with Lisunov Li-2 transport aircraft (license-built versions of the Douglas DC-3) with pilots conscripted from the Civil Air Fleet.

Grizodubova's Li-2s had a crew of six aviators: pilot, co-pilot, navigator, flight-technician, radio operator and air gunner. The unit had initially the task of bombing enemy troops, to fly to partisans and in June 1942 to help supply the besieged Leningrad. Subsequently, the 101st Long-Range Bomber Air Regiment was ordered to bomb Wehrmacht units that had broken the Bryansk and South-Western Fronts and were heading for Voronezh. Grizodubova led her regiment almost every night, overcoming strong flak defences and Luftwaffe night fighters in the Kursk, Orel, and L'gov areas.

In September 1942, the 101st Long-Range Aviation Regiment was placed at the disposal of the Central HQ of the Partisan Movement. The unit flew more than 1,850 sorties to partisan-held areas, delivering about 1,500 tons of arms and ammunition and hundreds of tons of radio equipment, printing presses, film cameras, and reading matter for Soviet partisan leaders. The Regiment also evacuated 2,500 wounded partisans and homeless orphans. However, poor airstrips and enemy fighters were a constant threat to the Li-2s and their crews. On Grizodubova's initiative, by March 1943 partisans had built an improved airstrip on the right bank of the Dnieper, where up to a dozen aircraft could be parked in daytime. On 27 May 1944 her regiment was awarded the honorific title Krasnosel'skiy for participating to break the siege of Leningrad. By the time Grizodubova was recalled to Moscow, in June 1944, she had flown about 200 sorties. Two months later, on 30 August, the 101st Long-Range Aviation Regiment was awarded the Order of the Red Banner and, later, the honorific of "Guards".

Post war

In the 1940s she served as the sole female member of the "Extraordinary State Commission for Ascertaining and Investigating Crimes Perpetrated by the German-Fascist Invaders and their Accomplices" ( or Чрезвычайная Государственная Комиссия; ChGK), appointed to investigate Nazi war crimes in the Soviet Union and to compensate the state for damages. She also assisted the future cosmonaut Svetlana Savitskaya in becoming a test pilot.

Legacy
Grizodubova was made an Honorary Citizen of Penza. A statue of her stands in front of Kutuzovsky Prospekt 34 in Moscow. Streets are named after her in various cities of the former Soviet Union.

Awards
 Hero of the Soviet Union (2 November 1938)
 Hero of Socialist Labour (6 January 1986)
 Two Orders of Lenin (2 November 1938 and 6 January 1986)
 Order of the October Revolution (26 April 1971)
Order of the Patriotic War 1st Class (12 March 1943)
 Order of the Red Banner of Labour (25 December 1936)
 Order of the Red Star (19 December 1937)
 campaign and jubilee medals

See also

 List of female Heroes of the Soviet Union

References

Bibliography
 

 
 Sorokina, M. A. "People and Procedures: Toward a History of the Investigation of Nazi Crimes in the USSR," Kritika: Explorations in Russian and Eurasian History, Volume 6, Issue 4, (2005) 797-831.
 S. P. Korolev. Encyclopedia of life and creativity" - edited by C. A. Lopota, RSC Energia. S. P. Korolev, 2014 

1909 births
1993 deaths
Musicians from Kharkiv
People from Kharkovsky Uyezd
Communist Party of the Soviet Union members
First convocation members of the Soviet of Nationalities
Soviet Air Force officers
Soviet women aviators
Russian women aviators
Ukrainian women aviators
Women air force personnel of the Soviet Union
Soviet World War II pilots
Russian people of World War II
Ukrainian women in World War II
Soviet women in World War II
Soviet aviation record holders
Soviet women aviation record holders
Heroes of the Soviet Union
Heroes of Socialist Labour
Recipients of the Order of Lenin
Recipients of the Order of the Red Banner of Labour
Recipients of the Order of the Red Star
Russian aviation record holders
Burials at Novodevichy Cemetery